Shchekotovo is a rural locality (a village) in Vorobyovskoye Rural Settlement, Sokolsky District, Vologda Oblast, Russia. The population was 6 as of 2002.

Geography 
Shchekotovo is located 69 km northeast of Sokol (the district's administrative centre) by road. Kuvayevo is the nearest rural locality.

References 

Rural localities in Sokolsky District, Vologda Oblast